Hongō Station is the name of four train stations in Japan:

 Hongō Station (Nagoya) in Nagoya, Aichi Prefecture.
 Hongō Station (Fukuoka)
 Hongō Station (Hiroshima)
 Hongō Station (Nagano)